Christine Lieberknecht (born Determann 7 May 1958 in Weimar) is a German politician of the Christian Democratic Union (CDU). From 2009 to 2014, she served as the Minister President of Thuringia. Lieberknecht was the first woman to become head of government in Thuringia and only the second woman to govern a German state.

Family, Education and Work 
Christine Lieberknecht grew up as the oldest of four siblings. Her father was Protestant-Lutheran pastor. After graduation in 1976 she studied Protestant theology at the Friedrich-Schiller-University Jena:

 1982 first theological examination
 1982 Vicariate with the Evangelical Lutheran Church of Thuringia
 1984 second theological examination
 from 1984 until 1990 Pastor in the Church District of Weimar

Political career
Lieberknecht co-chaired the CDU's national conventions in Düsseldorf (2004), Hanover (2007), Karlsruhe (2010) and in Berlin (2014).
After serving as

 Thuringian Minister of Education and Cultural Affairs (1990 to 1992)
 Thuringian Minister for Federal and European Affairs (1992 to 1994)
 Thuringian Minister for Federal Affairs with the State Chancellery (1994 to 1999)
 Speaker of the Thuringian Parliament (1999 to 2004)
 Chairperson of the CDU Faction of the Thuringian Parliament (2004 to 2008)
 Thuringian Minister for Social Affairs, Family and Health (2008 to 2009)

Lieberknecht was the 4th Minister President of the state of Thuringia from 2009 to 2014, and served as chairwoman of the CDU state party in Thuringia from 2009 to 2014.

Lieberknecht has been representing the constituency Weimarer Land II in the Landtag of Thuringia since 1991.

Lieberknecht served as a CDU delegate to the Federal Convention for the purpose of electing the President of Germany in 2012, 2017 and 2022.

In 2019, Lieberknecht was appointed by the Federal Ministry of the Interior, Building and Community to serve on the committee that oversaw the preparations for the 30th anniversary of German reunification.

Other activities (selection)
 Federal Foundation for the Reappraisal of the SED Dictatorship, Member of the Board (since 2016)
 German Children and Youth Foundation (DKJS), Member of the Board of Trustees (since 2010)
 Deutsches Museum, Member of the Board of Trustees (since 2009)
 Evangelical Church in Germany (EKD), Member of the Committee on the Social Order 
 Evangelical Working Group of the CDU/CSU, Deputy Chairwoman (since 1991)
 Konrad Adenauer Foundation (KAS), Member

References

External links 

 Official website
 Official Thüringer Landtag profile

1958 births
Living people
Politicians from Weimar
People from Bezirk Erfurt
20th-century German Lutheran clergy
Christian Democratic Union (East Germany) politicians
Christian Democratic Union of Germany politicians
Ministers-President of Thuringia
Members of the Landtag of Thuringia
Women members of State Parliaments in Germany
20th-century German women politicians
Women Ministers-President in Germany
Women Lutheran clergy